United Nations Security Council Resolution 101, adopted on November 24, 1953, noting reports by the United Nations Truce Supervision Organization in Palestine the Council found that the retaliatory action taken by Israeli forces at Qibya on October 14–15 and all such action constitute a violation of the cease-fire provisions of United Nations Security Council Resolution 54 and are inconsistent with the parties’ obligations under the General Armistice Agreement between Israel and Jordan as well as the Charter of the United Nations.  The Council expressed the strongest possible censure of this action and took note of the substantial evidence of crossings of the demarcation line by unauthorized persons.  The Council then called on the Israeli and Jordanian governments to co-operate with each other and requested that the Chief of Staff of the TSO report within three months with recommendations.

The resolution was adopted by nine votes to none; Lebanon and the Soviet Union abstained from the vote.

See also
List of United Nations Security Council Resolutions 101 to 200 (1953–1965)

References
Text of the Resolution at undocs.org

External links
 

 0101
 0101
Israeli–Palestinian conflict and the United Nations
November 1953 events